English English English was a humouristic children's educational TV show produced by the Israeli Educational Television.

The show was produced in 1973 and consisted of four episodes which were broadcast repeatedly on subsequent years. The show was intended to teach English grammar and syntax to junior high school pupils.

Participiants:
 Irv Kaplan
 Steve Byk
 Sharona Walters
 Eugene Blau
 Robin Laven
 Mark Brull
 Joy Morgenstein
 Avi Hoffman

References

External links
 English translation of 23.tv.co.il's Hebrew 'English English English' page by Google Translate

Israeli television shows